Sir William Dobell  (24 September 189913 May 1970) was an Australian portrait and landscape artist of the 20th century. Dobell won the Archibald Prize, Australia's premier award for portrait artists on three occasions. The Dobell Prize is named in his honour.

Career 
Dobell was born in Cooks Hill, a working-class neighbourhood of Newcastle, New South Wales in Australia to Robert Way Dobell and Margaret Emma (née Wrightson). His father was a builder and there were six children.

Dobell's artistic talents were evident early. In 1916, he was apprenticed to Newcastle architect, Wallace L. Porter and in 1924 he moved to Sydney as a draftsman. In 1925, he enrolled in evening art classes at the Sydney Art School (which later became the Julian Ashton Art School), with Henry Gibbons as his teacher. He was influenced by George Washington Lambert. He was also gay and consequently never married, while several of his works carried strong homoerotic overtones.

In 1929, Dobell was awarded the Society of Artists' Travelling Scholarship and travelled to England to the Slade School of Fine Art where he studied under Philip Wilson Steer and Henry Tonks. In 1930, he won first prize for figure painting at Slade and also travelled to Poland. In 1931 he moved on to Belgium and Paris, and after 10 years in Europe returned to Australia – taking with him a new Expressionist style of painting as opposed to his earlier naturalistic approach.

In 1939, he began as a part-time teacher at East Sydney Technical College. After the outbreak of war, he was drafted into the Civil Construction Corps of the Allied Works Council in 1941 as a camouflage painter; he later became an unofficial war artist. During his two years as a camouflage painter, he shared a tent with artist Joshua Smith.

In 1944, he had his first solo exhibition including public collection loans at the inauguration of the David Jones Art Gallery, Sydney.

In 1949, he visited New Guinea as a guest of Sir Edward Hallstrom with writers Frank Clune and Colin Simpson. The trip inspired a new series of tiny, brilliantly coloured landscapes. In 1950, he revisited New Guinea; on his return to Australia he continued to paint scenes of New Guinea, as well as portraits.

Between 1960 and 1963 TIME magazine commissioned Dobell to paint four portraits for covers, one per year, of: Sir Robert Menzies, Prime Minister of Australia; South Vietnam's President Ngô Đình Diệm; Frederick G. Donner, the Chairman of General Motors; and Tunku Abdul Rahman, Prime Minister of Malaysia.

In 1964, Dobell exhibited in a major retrospective at the Art Gallery of New South Wales and the first monograph of his work was written by James Gleeson.

The Archibald Prize controversy
In 1943, Dobell's portrait of Joshua Smith, titled "Portrait of an artist", was awarded the Archibald Prize. This was contested in 1944 by two unsuccessful entrants (Mary Edwell-Burke and Joseph Wolinski), who brought a lawsuit against Dobell and the Gallery's Board of Trustees in the Supreme Court of New South Wales on the grounds that the painting was a caricature and therefore not eligible for the prize. Public opinion was sharply divided, with most viewers puzzled by the unexpected portrait.

One art critic was highly laudatory:
Creating a man in the simplicity of everyday existence, Dobell reaches profundity by his understanding of this life which, at this instant, is realised and merged with his own nature.
During his courtroom defense of the piece Dobell stated:"Art fails to be Art if you fail to select for your design. All artists must do that and I did it."The claim was dismissed and the award was upheld, but the ordeal left Dobell emotionally disturbed and he retreated in 1945 to his sister's home at Wangi Wangi on Lake Macquarie, where he began to paint landscapes.  The Supreme Court opinion by Mister Justice Roper said:
 The picture in question is characterized by some startling exaggeration and distortion, clearly intended by the artist, his technique being too brilliant to admit of any other conclusion. It bears, nevertheless, a strong degree of likeness to the subject and is, I think, undoubtedly a pictorial representation of him. I find it a fact that it is a portrait within the meaning of the words in the will, and consequently the trustees did not err in admitting it to the competition.

Death and legacy 

Dobell was a very private man, known almost always as "Bill". The sole beneficiary of his estate was the Sir William Dobell Art Foundation, which was founded on 19 January 1971 and awards the Dobell Australian Drawing Biennial, which is named in his honour. He was cremated with Anglican rites and his ashes interred at Newcastle Memorial Park in Beresfield, New South Wales.

A film of Dobell's life, titled Yours sincerely, Bill Dobell was made in 1981 by Brian Adams and Cathy Shirley for the Australian Broadcasting Commission and the William Dobell Art Foundation. Brian Adams' book Portrait of an Artist – A biography of William Dobell was first published in 1983 by Hutchinson Publishing Group and revised in paperback in 1992 for Random House Australia.

A book on the life and art of William Dobell, William Dobell: An Artist's Life by Elizabeth Donaldson, was compiled in 2010 with the support of the Sir William Dobell Art Foundation and Dobell House, in Wangi Wangi. It is published by Exisle Publishing.

A biography, Bill: The Life of William Dobell, was published in 2014 by Scott Bevan.

Analysis 
Dobell's style is unique in being able to adapt to suit the character of his subject. This was best described by James Gleeson; "One of the astonishing things about Dobell's portraiture is his ability to adjust his style to the nature of the personality he is portraying ... If the character of his sitter is broad and generous, he paints broadly and generously. If the character is contained and inward looking, he uses brushstrokes that convey this fact. In his later portraits one has only to look at a few square inches of a painted sleeve to know what sort of person is wearing it."

Among private and other public holdings, examples of Dobell's work are exhibited in the Newcastle Region Art Gallery, the Art Gallery of New South Wales, the Queensland Art Gallery in Brisbane and the National Gallery of Australia in Canberra.

Awards 
 In 1943, Archibald Prize for Mr Joshua Smith, a portrait of the artist Joshua Smith (unsuccessfully challenged in court as being caricature rather than portraiture)
 In 1948, Archibald Prize for a portrait of Margaret Olley 
 In 1948, the Wynne Prize for Storm Approaching Wangi
 In 1959, Archibald Prize for a portrait of Dr E. G. MacMahon

Honours 
 Officer of the Order of the British Empire (OBE) 1 January 1965, "In recognition of service to the arts as a portrait and landscape painter" 
 Knight Bachelor 3 June 1966, "In recognition of service to the arts"
 The federal electoral Division of Dobell in New South Wales is named after Dobell

Exhibitions 
Dobell had the following solo exhibitions:

 1942 'Margaret Preston and William Dobell loan exhibition' Art Gallery of New South Wales, 19 March – 16 April
 1944 'William Dobell', David Jones' Art Gallery, Sydney, 1–26 August
 1954 'William Dobell, exhibition of paintings', David Jones' Art Gallery, 27 January – 17 February
 1959 'The Art of William Dobell' National Gallery Society of Queensland, Finney Isles Gallery, Brisbane, August–September
 1960 'William Dobell', War Memorial Gallery of Fine Arts, The University of Sydney, 12–27 April
 1960 'William Dobell', Museum of Modern Art of Australia, Melbourne, 17 May – 10 June
 1960 'Dobell loan exhibition', Newcastle City Art Gallery, 22 June – 30 July
 1960 Adelaide, Adelaide Festival of Arts
 1964 'William Dobell paintings from 1926 to 1964', Art Gallery of New South Wales, 15 July – 30 August
 1964 'William Dobell exhibitions', Bendigo Art Gallery, Bendigo, Victoria, November
 1965 'William Dobell, first London exhibition', Commonwealth Arts Festival, Qantas Gallery, London, 16 September – 2 Oct.
 1970 'Sir William Dobell recent paintings', Newcastle City Art Gallery, 3–26 April
 1970 'Paintings and Drawings by Sir William Dobell', Girl Guides Association of New South Wales, Robert Wardrop Galleries, Sydney, 26 September – 1 October
 1985 'William Dobell. The Painting of a Portrait', Lake Macquarie Community Gallery, 7 February – 10 March; S. H. Ervin Gallery, 21 March – 28 April
 1993 'William Dobell exhibitions', David Jones Art Gallery, 1–21 April
 1997–1998 'William Dobell; the painter's progress,' The Art Gallery of New South Wales, 14 February – 27 April 97; Newcastle Region Art Gallery, 7 May – 6 July 97; Museum of Modern Art at Heide, Melbourne, 29 July – 21 September 97; Queensland Art Gallery, 25 October – 7 December 97; Tasmanian Museum and Art Gallery, 8 January – 1 March 98

The book William Dobell: An Artist's Life by Elizabeth Donaldson published in 2010 includes many of Dobell's works, as well as archival photographs.

A biography of Dobell, Bill: The Life of William Dobell, by Scott Bevan was published in 2014.

See also 
 Visual arts of Australia

References

External links 
 William Dobell at the Art Gallery of New South Wales
 Brian Adams Portrait of an Artist a biography of William Dobell, Hutchinson Australia 1983.
 Biography
 Johhny Russell c1955 – Ballarat Fine Art Gallery.
 William Dobell on Artabase. Sketch for Margaret Olley 1948 
 Judith White, William Dobell: Yours Sincerely , Australian Art Collector Issue 12 Apr–Jun 2000

1899 births
1970 deaths
Alumni of the Slade School of Fine Art
Archibald Prize winners
Australian gay artists
Gay painters
City of Lake Macquarie
Australian LGBT painters
Australian Officers of the Order of the British Empire
People from Newcastle, New South Wales
Australian Knights Bachelor
Wynne Prize winners
20th-century Australian painters
20th-century Australian male artists
Julian Ashton Art School alumni
Australian portrait painters
Australian male painters
20th-century Australian LGBT people